Aleksandr Lvovich Ivanchenko (born 1945) is a Russian writer.

He was born in the city of Krasnoturyinsk, Sverdlovsk region. He worked in many trades such as locksmith, firefighter, etc. He also served as a soldier in the Soviet Army in the 1960s.

He published his first works in 1976, a story titled "Fisheye" and a novel named Solar Plexus. His novel Monogram was nominated for the inaugural Russian Booker Prize. He also won the Antibooker Prize for his work "Bathing the Red Horse". His work was promoted by the literary magazine Ural and is often associated with Russian postmodernism.

He was a member the Writers' Union of the USSR, the Union of Russian Writers, Russian PEN Center, etc.

References

Russian writers
Maxim Gorky Literature Institute alumni